is a Japanese manga series written and illustrated by Hiroyuki Nishimori. It has been serialized in Shogakukan's shōnen manga magazine Shōnen Sunday S since June 2020. A television drama adaptation was broadcast for 28 episodes on NHK from May to June 2022.

Characters

Media

Manga
Written and illustrated by Hiroyuki Nishimori, Kanakana started in Shogakukan's shōnen manga magazine Shōnen Sunday S on June 25, 2020. Shogakukan has collected its chapters into individual tankōbon volumes. The first volume was released on December 18, 2020. As of July 15, 2022, four volumes have been released.

Volume list

Drama
In January 2022, it was announced that the manga would receive a television drama adaptation; it was broadcast for 28 episodes on NHK from May 16 to June 30 of the same year.

Reception
Spy × Familys author, Tatsuya Endo, recommended the series in a comment featured on the obi of the fourth volume.

References

External links
 
 

Comedy anime and manga
NHK television dramas
Shogakukan manga
Shōnen manga